This article chronicles the life of Keith Miller, an Australian Test cricketer and Australian rules footballer, from his birth on 28 November 1919 until 20 August 1940, when he left civilian life and joined the Militia (army reserve) during World War II. Born in the town of Sunshine on the outskirts of Melbourne, Miller made sport the focal point of his early life. The youngest of four children of Scottish descent, Miller joined his siblings in being inculcated with a love of sport by their father, playing football in winter and cricket in summer. Miller's father—an engineer and sportslover—emphasised the importance of technique over power; Miller benefited as he was of small stature during his childhood and could not rely on brute strength. Miller yearned to be a horse racing jockey, as he felt that he would not have the physique to succeed in cricket or football.

Miller received his secondary education at the academically selective Melbourne High School, where his mathematics teacher was the incumbent Australian cricket captain Bill Woodfull. He was an academically poor student who neglected his studies but excelled at sports. He made the school's first-choice cricket team at the age of 14 and gained attention for his technical and defensive ability, which was compared to that of Woodfull. In one match, he scored 61 runs to orchestrate a lower-order fightback in a low-scoring match against Woodfull's Carlton team, prompting his teacher to award him a silver eggcup during maths class. It remained one of his most treasured possessions.

In the following year, Miller grew  and began to play cricket and football with more power. Leaving school at the end of year 10, having just turned 17, Miller played cricket for the Victorian Colts for two seasons, before breaking through to be selected for his first-class debut late in the 1937–38 season. He played sporadically until making his Sheffield Shield debut during the 1939–40 season and scoring his maiden century. During this time, Miller played exclusively as a batsman; he was yet to become a fast bowler. Miller's football career also took off. Starting in 1937, Miller played for the Brighton Football Club in the Victorian Football Association for three years, mainly as a defender. At the start of his fourth season, he restricted Bob Pratt, regarded as the best forward of the time, to one goal for the match and was named best on ground. He was promptly signed by the St Kilda Football Club to play in the leading Victorian Football League in 1940, where his team came second to last.

Birth 

Born in the western Melbourne suburb of Sunshine on 28 November 1919, Keith Ross Miller was the youngest of Leslie (Les Sr) and Edith (Edie) Miller's four children. He had two older brothers and a sister. Sister Gladys was 12 when Miller was born, while Les Jr and Ray were nine and seven respectively. Miller was named after the Australian pioneer aviator brothers Keith and Ross Smith, who were half-way through their historic flight from England to Australia at the time of his birth. Miller's two Christian names reflected his Scottish heritage; his father's family originated from the dock area of Edinburgh and Dundee, and his paternal grandfather arrived in Australia in April 1849. The area was and remains a working-class area. The town's lifeblood was the farm machinery maker H. V. McKay, which employed a large proportion of the population. Miller's father started as a teacher in Warracknabeal in rural Victoria, before working as an engineer for McKay in Ballarat until a transfer brought him to Sunshine.

Early schooling
Sunshine offered open fields, and the three Miller boys quickly took a liking to sport during their childhood, playing Australian rules football in winter and cricket in summer. Their father had played cricket for Warracknabeal, winning a premiership in the local league in 1900. Les taught the boys to play with a side-on stance and underlined the importance of orthodox batting technique, reminding his sons to maintain a high leading elbow when hitting the ball. They were taught to rely on a solid defence, concentration, and self-control in the mould of the leading Victorian and Australian Test batsman of the era, Bill Ponsford. Miller began his schooling in Sunshine, where he quickly became known for his diminutive height; he was one of the smallest children in the school. At the age of seven, Miller moved to the inner-eastern middle-class Melbourne suburb of Elsternwick, where his parents had purchased a two-storey house with a spacious garden that allowed the children to play sport. By this time, his elder brothers had given him the derisive nickname Weedy. Miller's small size and age deficit meant that he conceded a strength advantage to his brothers in backyard cricket matches. This forced him to develop his technique rather than rely on power, which held him in good stead for his future career. Whenever Miller managed to dismiss his brothers and earn himself some batting time, he typically played with a straight bat in a watchful manner, as it was difficult for him to remove his brothers, meaning that his opportunities with the bat were rare. Like Miller in his backyard, Ponsford was known for his powers of concentration and was the first person to score two quadruple centuries in first-class cricket. Miller often practised for hours by himself; he put a tennis ball inside a stocking, before suspending it from a clothes line and hitting it back and forth. Indoors, Miller developed a lifelong love of classical music through a cousin who liked to play Mozart. He played flute in the Elsternwick school band but could not read music.

As a small child, Miller's major sporting aspiration was to be a jockey, but he continued to play cricket and Australian football. At the age of 12, he played for an under-15 Victorian schoolboys cricket team that toured Queensland under the captaincy of future Test batsman Merv Harvey. At the time, Miller stood only  and wielded a sawn-off bat. His shots did not travel far, but he impressed observers with the manner in which he moved his feet and stroked the ball. Miller's small stature in a contact sport such as football forced him to rely on physical courage, something for which he became famed. However, his lack of height prompted him to turn to horseracing. Miller saw his first Melbourne Cup in 1926 at the age of seven and had been fascinated ever since. Caulfield Racecourse was only a short distance from the family home, and Miller spent many early mornings watching the trainers and jockeys go through their routines. He eventually persuaded his father to let him take horseriding lessons. Aside from being attracted to the racing culture, Miller felt that as he appeared destined to be a small person, he was more likely to have a successful career as a jockey than in cricket or football.

Melbourne High School

Miller went to the local state school before transferring to Melbourne High School—a selective government institution that accepted students through an academic exam—at the start of 1934. The school's emphasis on scholastic and sporting excellence and its culture was more in line with that of a private school than a standard government school. Australian Test captain Bill Woodfull was on the teaching staff as Miller's mathematics teacher. Because he did little study and focused his energy on sport, Miller was a mediocre student. In addition to cricket and football, Miller played baseball and competed in swimming. This disappointed Woodfull, a disciplined man who invoked the school's motto Honour the Work in exhorting his students to work hard as Australia was attempting to emerge from the depths of the Great Depression. Despite being Australia's captain, Woodfull refused to involve himself in the coaching of the school's cricket teams, feeling that it would intrude on the responsibilities of the sports teachers. Despite this, Woodfull watched the students at cricket training and quickly noticed Miller's skills. Aged 14 and still under , Miller was selected in the school's First XI. With his pads flapping against his stomach and sporting a sawn-down bat, Miller batted at No. 6 and scored 44 on his senior debut. Although his lack of power was obvious, Miller's control and solidity prompted the spectators to call him the Unbowlable, the same nickname that was accorded to Woodfull, who had a similarly strong defensive style. Melbourne went on to win the match, and Miller impressed his captain Keith Truscott, who fought for his selection and took him under his wing. Truscott later became an ace fighter pilot in the Royal Australian Air Force, and Miller would follow in his footsteps. Truscott's social influence compounded the distractions from Miller's study. Miller failed all eight of his subjects at the end of 1934, and with an average mark of 25%, was the class dunce. He scored zero in his final exam for Woodfull's geometry class, and was forced to repeat year 9.

Club cricket

At the start of the 1934–35 season, Truscott took Miller to a try out with St Kilda Cricket Club, but his protege could not find a place in any of the club's five teams. Joining the local sub-district cricket club Elsternwick, Miller did not get to bat or bowl on debut, and was then dropped to the Second XI after his first match for poor fielding. Nevertheless, the former Victorian state player Hughie Carroll spotted Miller's talent and lured him to the rival South Melbourne club. However, Elsternwick used the competition rules to prevent Miller from playing for Souths, so he continued to play in the former's second-choice team. In the meantime, Miller continued to play for his school with steady results, scoring 30 and 25 in two matches against Melbourne's main rival, University High School. A loosening of the zoning rules allowed Miller to start competing for South Melbourne in the following season. However, the rules required South Melbourne to play Miller in their First XI, else St Kilda could reclaim him, so he made his district cricket debut for South at the start of the 1935–36 season after a trial in the nets.

It was at South Melbourne that Miller met Ian Johnson and Lindsay Hassett, his future Australia teammates and captains. On debut against St Kilda, Miller scored only 11 not out after batting for 62 minutes at No. 7, but observers felt the young batsman would succeed if he physically grew. Miller passed his exams at the end of 1935 and continued his development on the field. He began to develop a leg break and googly and represented his school against a visiting schoolboy team from Ceylon. Miller scored an unbeaten 28 to prevent a loss and later cited the experience as helping to broaden his horizons towards other cultures. Assisted by cross-training in baseball, his improved fielding skills saw him placed in the slips and he was named as Melbourne High School's cricket sports champion for 1936. Miller averaged 86 with the bat and took 13 wickets at an average of 9.23, including innings figures of seven wickets for 29 runs against St Kevin's and 3/5 against University High. These performances prompted Woodfull to write in the school magazine that "Miller has Test possibilities". 

In March, Miller played for South Melbourne against Carlton, who were captained by Woodfull. South Melbourne batted first and collapsed to 5/6. The sixth wicket fell at 32, bringing Miller to the crease. He guided his team to 141, and was the last man out for 61 after putting on a stand of 65 in 95 minutes with the No. 11. Miller struck four boundaries in a 147-minute innings. The crowd of 14,000—the largest of the season—gave Miller a standing ovation, and newspapers compared him to Ponsford and Alan Kippax. Carlton went on to win the game, and when it was obvious that this would be the case, Miller's captain let him bowl for the first time. The small batsman took his first wicket in district cricket when Test paceman Laurie Nash took a high-leaping catch. Miller's performance prompted Carlton to donate a silver eggcup as a memento "for sterling performance". Woodfull presented Miller with the trophy during algebra class. It was one of the few sports trophies that Miller kept in later life.

During 1936, Miller underwent a sudden growth spurt, including a three-month period during which he added  to his height. He began to play football with more physical aggression and developed the ability to leap high and take airborne marks. The increase in size allowed Miller to become the longest kicker in the school team. Having grown  in a year, Miller was unrecognisable to Hassett upon his return to South Melbourne the following season. Eventually, Miller reached  in height, thwarting his ambition to be a jockey, although he never lost his love for the racetrack.

Representative beginnings
At the start of the 1936–37 season, Miller was selected for the Colts, a state under-21 team that played at district level. At the end of the 1936 school year, Miller completed year 10 by passing five of his eight subjects. Disinclined towards university studies, he left school without finishing his leaving year and began working as a clerk for a car business. Miller felt confident that he could make a career out of sport and therefore felt that further education was unnecessary.

Miller spent the 1937–38 season with the Colts and won the team's batting trophy for having the best average; he made 340 runs at 42.50. Across the entire competition, Miller had the eighth highest average. He scored three half-centuries and a 102 against Northcote. At this stage, Miller was a solid, slow and steady batsman, who accumulated his runs gradually, but The Age predicted that his physical growth would open his horizons, opining "Once he fills out—he is rather tall for his weight—Miller should become a brilliant, aggressive batsman". In early February 1938, late in the summer, he made his first-class debut for Victoria as an 18-year-old and hit 181 in 289 minutes against Tasmania at the Melbourne Cricket Ground. With his increased power, Miller began to loft the ball over the infield and struck five fours. During the 1938–39 season, he rejoined South Melbourne and played four first-class matches for Victoria, scoring 125 runs at an average of 25.00. However, Miller was yet to play in the Sheffield Shield competition, only taking to the field in one-off matches against other teams. In the two matches against Tasmania in December 1938, Miller took his first catch, but managed only four, seven not out and three, and he spent a period of time outside the team. Miller was recalled in March 1939—late in the season—for two matches against Western Australia in Perth, scoring 111 runs at 37.00, notching his first first-class fifty of the season in the second innings of the first match.

Miller achieved more success as a footballer. In 1937, he followed his brothers Les and Ray and joined the Brighton Football Club in the Victorian Football Association (VFA). The VFA was the second tier of Australian rules football below the Victorian Football League (VFL). A defender, Miller played his first two seasons on the flanks; he was yet to reach his physical peak and lacked the power required to play in central defensive positions until his third season, in 1939. At this stage, he was unable to hip and shoulder his opponents and relied on his running ability and accurate kicking.

During the 1939–40 season, Miller was selected to make his Sheffield Shield debut in a match against South Australia at Adelaide Oval. Batting at No. 4, Miller came to the crease at 2/9 after a top-order collapse, but managed only four runs before being caught by Richard Whitington—with whom he later wrote cricket books—from the bowling of Harold Cotton. When Victoria fielded, Miller ran out his future Invincibles captain Don Bradman; it was the first time that Bradman had been caught short of his ground in first-class cricket. Miller also took his first catch at Shield level, that of Mervyn Waite. In the second innings, he managed seven before being bowled by  leg spinner Clarrie Grimmett, one of the leading bowlers in the world in the 1930s. One of Miller's teammates was Percy Beames, who also happened to be his manager at Vacuum Oil, where he had moved from his first job. Miller made 41 and 47 not out in his second match against Queensland, top-scoring in the second innings as his team completed a seven-wicket victory. Miller retained his place for the match against New South Wales, but was out for 14 in both innings. He had difficulties against leg spin, falling to Bill O'Reilly and Cec Pepper. In the return match against South Australia, Miller decided to take the initiative against Grimmett, charging down the wicket to drive the leg spinner. He featured in a 165-run partnership with Hassett, and at times bluffed Grimmett by moving forward before leaning back after the bowler had adjusted his length. Miller reached 108 to complete his first century in Shield competition. He was given out caught by Bradman from Garth Burton, after an appeal for a disputed catch; Miller asked the umpires if Bradman had caught a bump ball. Nevertheless, Bradman praised Miller's innings, and Clem Hill predicted a bright future for the Victorian. Apart from the century, Miller had an average season, making 37, 1 and 24 in his remaining innings to end the campaign with 298 runs at 29.80. He did not bowl during the season.

Breakthrough into the VFL 

In 1940, Miller started his fourth season in the VFA. In a match against Coburg, regarded as one of the strongest teams in the competition, he was assigned to man Bob Pratt, who was regarded as the greatest forward of the era. Pratt had scored 678 goals in ten seasons for South Melbourne in the Victorian Football League (VFL), the top tier of football, and had scored more than 100 goals in each of his last three seasons. Miller restricted Pratt to one goal for the match and was named as the best on ground. In the third quarter, Miller restricted Pratt to two marks, and in the fourth quarter, he prevented the forward from getting a single kick. Scouts from the VFL club St Kilda signed Miller on the spot. Reacting to Miller's signing, The Age opined that he "is one of the most promising players ever to enter league ranks, and can be played anywhere in defence. It was he who kept Bob Pratt to one goal in last week's Association match."

At the time, World War II had broken out and by mid-1940, France, Belgium and the Netherlands had fallen to Nazi Germany. Australia had declared war on Germany and Miller wanted to join the military, but St Kilda told him that if he was deployed outside Victoria, his career would be in jeopardy. As a result, Miller postponed his enlistment until the end of the season.

Playing as a defender, Miller debuted for St Kilda in their fifth round home game against Carlton, at the Junction Oval on 25 May, playing on the half-back flank. At the start of the game, Miller's opponent Ron Cooper king hit and concussed him. Miller said of the experience, "I learnt more in a second or two than I would have in a year". When St Kilda met Carlton in the return match at Princes Park, Miller shoulder bumped Cooper in the first minute of the match, forcing his opponent to leave the field. In a match against Richmond, Miller was physically targeted by renowned enforcer Jack Dyer, known as Captain Blood. However, Dyer slipped and missed Miller. In one game, Miller was reported for showing dissent to a goal umpire, but was let off without punishment. St Kilda came second to last, so they did not make the finals.

Notes

References 

Keith Miller
Victoria cricketers
Early lives by sportspeople